Storøysundet is a strait in the Svalbard archipelago. It separates the island of Storøya to the east from Nordaustlandet to the west.

The area is included in the Nordaust-Svalbard Nature Reserve.

References

Straits of Svalbard
Storøya
Nordaustlandet